Minan (also Romanized as Mīnān) is a village in Qanibeyglu Rural District, Zanjanrud District, Zanjan County, Zanjan Province, Iran. At the 2006 census, its population was 139, in 29 families.

References 

Populated places in Zanjan County